Baby It's Christmas is the ninth studio and first Christmas album by Australian theatre performer, singer and TV presenter David Campbell, released through Sony Music Australia on 26 October 2018. The album includes 11 Christmas standards and one new track; (the title track), written by singer Rick Price.

Track listing
 "Holly Jolly Christmas" – 2:36
 "Baby It's Christmas" – 3:05
 "I've Got My Love to Keep Me Warm" – 2:47
 "Jingle Bells" – 3:22
 "When My Heart Finds Christmas" – 3:34
 "It's the Most Wonderful Time of the Year" – 2:31	
 "The Christmas Song" – 3:38
 "Rockin' Around the Christmas Tree" – 2:13
 "Silent Night" – 4:18	
 "Little Saint Nick" – 2:36
 "White Christmas" – 4:43	
 "O Come, All Ye Faithful" – 3:21

Charts

Release history

References

2018 Christmas albums
David Campbell (Australian musician) albums
Christmas albums by Australian artists
Covers albums
Sony Music Australia albums